Sayit-e Do (also Romanized as Sāyīt-e Do) is a village in Qeblehi Rural District, in the Central District of Dezful County, Khuzestan Province, Iran. At the 2006 census, its population was 667, in 158 families.

References 

Populated places in Dezful County